BNS Shapla is a River class minesweeper of the Bangladeshi Navy. She is serving Bangladeshi Navy from 1995.

History
This ship served in Royal Navy as HMS Waveney (M2003). She was commissioned on 12 July 1984. She was assigned to the South Wales Division of Royal Navy Reserve. She was withdrawn from service in 1993. In 1995, she was sold to Bangladesh.

Career
BNS Shapla was commissioned in Bangladesh Navy on 27 April 1995. She is currently being used as a patrol ship

Armament
The ship carries one Bofors 40 mm Mark III gun which can be used in both anti-surface and anti-air role. She also carries two L44A1 7.62 mm general purpose machine guns.

See also
List of active ships of the Bangladesh Navy
BNS Shaikat
BNS Surovi
BNS Shaibal

References

Ships of the Bangladesh Navy
Minesweepers of the Bangladesh Navy